José Antonio Piqueras Arenas (born 1955) is a Spanish historian. Professor of Contemporary History of the Jaume I University (UJI), his research lines focus on the study of social relations and political attitudes. Among other topics, his academic production has dealt with the history of the labour movement, slavery, 19th-century Spanish history, and the history of Cuba and the Antilles.

Biography 
Born in 1955 in Enguera, Valencia, he earned a PhD from the University of Valencia (UV) reading a dissertation titled Orígenes sociales de la Restauración in 1990. He was appointed as senior lecturer at the UJI in 1993, and as professor in the area of Contemporary History in 1998. He is the co-editor of Historia Social, a leading Spanish-language journal in the field of social history.

He was elected as corresponding member of the Academy of History of Cuba in 2014.

Works

References 
Citations

Bibliography
 
 
 
 
 
 
 
 
 

Social historians
Historians of the Bourbon Restoration in Spain
Historians of slavery
Historians of Cuba
University of Valencia alumni
20th-century Spanish historians
Historians of the labour movement in Spain
1955 births
Living people
21st-century Spanish historians